Huai Khot is a district (amphoe) in the central part of Uthai Thani province, northern Thailand.

History
Tambons Huai Khot, Suk Ruethai and Thong Lang were separated from Ban Rai district and formed Huai Khot minor district (king amphoe) on 1 August 1984. It was upgraded to a full district on 3 November 1993.

Geography
Neighbouring districts are (from the south clockwise) Ban Rai, Lan Sak and Nong Chang of Uthai Thani Province.

Administration
The district is divided into three sub-districts (tambons), which are further subdivided into 31 villages (mubans). There are no municipal (thesaban) areas. There are a further three tambon administrative organizations (TAO).

References

External links
https://web.archive.org/web/20070731173847/http://www.huaikhot.net/ Website of district (Thai)
amphoe.com

Huai Khot